Crutch is a 2004 autobiographical coming of age film written and directed by Rob Moretti.

Synopsis
Young David (Eben Gordon) seems to have a normal middle-class life in the suburban world outside New York City. When David's father (James A. Earley) leaves his alcoholic wife (Juanita Walsh) after 17 years, David is forced to become parent to his siblings and caregiver to his alcoholic mother. Theater coach Kenny (Rob Moretti) becomes enamoured of David. Overwhelmed by his home situation, David is weakened and falls prey to the taboo. Giving in to Kenny's advances, David becomes involved with drugs and alcohol.

Cast
Eben Gordon as David Graham 
Rob Moretti as Kenny Griffith 
Juanita Walsh as Katie Graham 
Jennifer Laine Williams as Julia 
Jennifer Katz as Maryann
James A. Earley as Jack Graham 
Robert Bray as Michael Graham 
Laura O'Reilly as Lisa Graham 
Tim Loftus as Zack 
Sylvia Norman as Linda 
Frankie Faison as Jerry
Tia Dionne Hodge as Janice

Critical response
Anita Gates of The New York Times writes "'Crutch' doesn't have the texture or power of "Blue Car," Karen Moncrieff's 2002 film with Agnes Bruckner as the neglected, emotionally needy teenager and David Strathairn as the high school poetry teacher who takes advantage ... [it] does sound a note of real anguish, however."  Don Willmott of Filmcritic.com writes "'Crutch' comes across as an extremely personal exorcism of Moretti's suburban gothic adolescence, for better and for worse. Like the scribblings in a teenager's diary, the film vacillates between insight and exaggeration". Movies Online opines "'CRUTCH' is a captivating and brutally honest look into love, loss, lies and our own dark secrets".  However, on the negative side, DVD Verdict opines that "Rob Moretti's Crutch is the kind of film I feel bad for not liking. It's awfully sincere, and, darn it, everyone involved tries real hard, but the movie still comes up short".

References

Further reading
Marketwire, September 2004, "Crutch acquired by Illuminare"

External links

Official Web Site 
Yahoo! Movies
Blockbuster online

2004 films
American LGBT-related films
2000s English-language films
2000s American films
Films about disability